Cadorna's pipistrelle (Hypsugo cadornae) is a species of vesper bat in the family Vespertilionidae. It is found in India, Laos, Myanmar, Thailand, and Vietnam.

Taxonomy

References

Hypsugo
Taxonomy articles created by Polbot
Mammals described in 1916
Taxa named by Oldfield Thomas
Bats of Southeast Asia
Bats of South Asia